Peter Elzinga (born April 6, 1944) was the executive director of the Progressive Conservative Party in Alberta, Canada, a former Member of Parliament in the House of Commons of Canada and former cabinet minister in the Legislative Assembly of Alberta.

A farmer and rancher by training, Elzinga was first elected to the federal House of Commons as the Progressive Conservative Member of Parliament representing Pembina, Alberta in the 1974 federal election. He served as president of the PC Party of Canada from 1983 to 1986, and was chair of the 1983 PC leadership convention.

Elzinga resigned his seat in the House of Commons to run in the 1986 Alberta provincial election. He was elected to the Legislative Assembly of Alberta as the Member of the Legislative Assembly for Sherwood Park and joined the cabinet of Don Getty as Minister of Agriculture. In 1989, he became Minister of Agriculture and Trade.

He co-chaired Ralph Klein's successful bid to win the leadership of the Alberta PC Party in 1992, and subsequently became Deputy Premier and Minister of Federal and Intergovernmental Affairs. Elzinga did not run for re-election in 1993 provincial election. He chaired the PC Party's election campaign that year, and the subsequent campaigns in the 1997, 2001 and 2004 provincial elections. Elzinga returned from the private sector to serve as chief of staff to Premier Klein from 1998 to 2004.

In 2018 Mr. Peter Elzinga, ICD.D, joined Atlas Biotechnologies Ltd. as Chairman of the Board of Directors.

References
Alberta PC article on Elzinga
 
 www.atlasgrowers.com

1944 births
Living people
Canadian political consultants
Canadian ranchers
Farmers from Alberta
Members of the House of Commons of Canada from Alberta
Progressive Conservative Association of Alberta MLAs
Progressive Conservative Party of Canada MPs
Members of the Executive Council of Alberta